Orchestra Wellington is New Zealand's oldest professional regional orchestra, based in the capital city of Wellington. It hosts an annual subscription series of concerts in the Michael Fowler Centre, performing varied repertoire from the Classical, Romantic and contemporary periods. The orchestra commissions and performs works by New Zealand composers, with John Psathas  the current composer-in-residence. It also performs large choral works with the Orpheus Choir of Wellington, and regularly accompanies Wellington stage performances by the Royal New Zealand Ballet, New Zealand Opera, and Wellington Opera.

History 

The orchestra was founded by New Zealand violinist Alex Lindsay as the Alex Lindsay String Orchestra in 1948, and established as an incorporated society, the Wellington Regional Orchestra Foundation, in 1950. It was renamed the Lindsay String Orchestra of Wellington in 1967, and re-established with assistance from the Arts Council of New Zealand in 1973 as the Wellington Regional Orchestra. In 1991 the orchestra was renamed Wellington Sinfonia, and in 2005 renamed again to Vector Wellington Orchestra. In 2012 the orchestra dropped the naming sponsorship from electricity company Vector and rebranded to its current name, Orchestra Wellington.

References

External links 

 

Organisations based in Wellington
Culture in Wellington
New Zealand orchestras
Symphony orchestras
Musical groups from Wellington